The 1600 siege of Yanagawa took place just after the decisive battle of Sekigahara in which Tokugawa Ieyasu secured his control over Japan.

History 
Tachibana Ginchiyo and Tachibana Muneshige remained one of the chief opponents to Tokugawa on Kyūshū, and was besieged in his castle at Yanagawa by Katō Kiyomasa, Kuroda Yoshitaka and Nabeshima Naoshige.

Muneshige surrendered under the assumption that he could then switch sides and aid the Tokugawa-loyal forces against the Shimazu clan of Satsuma, but Ieyasu forbade this plan from going through.

References

Turnbull, Stephen (1998). 'The Samurai Sourcebook'. London: Cassell & Co.

Yanagawa
1600 in Japan
Conflicts in 1600